The 2018–19 Spartan South Midlands Football League season was the 22nd in the history of Spartan South Midlands Football League, a football competition in England.

The provisional club allocations for steps 5 and 6 were announced by the FA on 25 May. The constitution is subject to ratification by the league at its AGM on 23 June.

Premier Division

The Premier Division featured 16 clubs which competed in the division last season, along with four new clubs:
 Arlesey Town, relegated from the Southern League
 Baldock Town, promoted from Division One
 North Greenford United, transferred from the Combined Counties League
 Potton United, promoted from the United Counties League Division One

League table

Division One

Division One featured 20 clubs in the division for this season, of which there are three new clubs:
 Amersham Town, promoted from Division Two
 Buckingham Town, transferred from the United Counties League; they were renamed Milton Keynes Robins midway through the season.
 Park View, promoted from Division Two

League table

Division Two

Division Two featured 13 clubs which competed in the division last season, along with two clubs joined from the Herts County League:
Bovingdon
Sarratt

Also, Loughton Manor relocated and were renamed New Bradwell St Peter.

League table

References

2018-19
9